Sille Thomsen (born 18 February 1992) is a Danish handball player who plays for Ringkøbing Håndbold.

References

1992 births
Living people
People from Køge Municipality
Danish female handball players
Sportspeople from Region Zealand